The K12-B is a natural gas field in the Netherlands sector of the North Sea (in the northern part of the country). Natural gas production in the field started in 1987.

To resolve the production-related carbon dioxide emissions issue, the project of re-injection  into the gas reservoir has been implemented.  In addition to the recovery of natural gas production, it serves also as a  storage project.  Several research projects use the  storage project at K12-B as a source of data to validate models and gain insight into various related processes.

See also

List of oil and gas fields of the North Sea
North Sea oil
K7-K12 gas fields

References

External links
K12-B
More info on  project in k12-b 

Natural gas fields in the Netherlands
North Sea energy